HMS L24 was a L-class submarine built for the Royal Navy during World War I. The boat was not completed before the end of the war and was sunk in an accidental collision in 1924.

Design and description
L9 and its successors were enlarged to accommodate 21-inch (53.3 cm) torpedoes and more fuel. They displaced  on the surface and  submerged. The L-class submarines had a crew of 38 officers and ratings.

For surface running, the boats were powered by two 12-cylinder Vickers  diesel engines, each driving one propeller shaft. When submerged each propeller was driven by a  electric motor. They could reach  on the surface and  underwater.

The boats were armed with four 21-inch torpedo tubes in the bow and two 18-inch (45 cm) in broadside mounts. They carried four reload torpedoes for the 21-inch tubes for a grand total of ten torpedoes of all sizes. They were also armed with a  deck gun.

Construction and career
HMS L24 was built by Vickers at their Barrow-in-Furness shipyard, launched on 19 February 1919, and completed at an unknown date. The boat was sunk with all hands lost in a collision with the battleship  during an exercise off Portland Bill in the English Channel on 10 January 1924. A memorial is located in St Ann's Church in HMNB Portsmouth.

Her hydroplanes remain set to hard dive, indicating that she was trying to take evasive action. A hatch is open and there is obvious damage where Resolution sliced into her hull. The wreck is designated as a protected place under the Protection of Military Remains Act 1986.

Notes

References

External links
 SI 2008/0950 Designation under the Protection of Military Remains Act

 

British L-class submarines
Ships built in Barrow-in-Furness
1919 ships
World War I submarines of the United Kingdom
British submarine accidents
Shipwrecks in the English Channel
Protected Wrecks of the United Kingdom
Royal Navy ship names
Maritime incidents in 1924
Submarines sunk in collisions
1924 disasters in the United Kingdom
Warships lost with all hands